Shadow Raiders is a Canadian animated television series produced by Mainframe Entertainment and syndicated by The Summit Media Group, that aired from September 16, 1998, to June 23, 1999. The show was loosely based on the Trendmasters toy line, War Planets. The original character designs were created by ReBoot designer, Brendan McCarthy. The series focused on the four warring planets of a solar system called the Cluster as they were forced to set aside their differences and form a coalition against the menace of the Beast Planet.

Plot
Shadow Raiders is set in a five-planet star system known as the Cluster. The four inhabited planets are in a constant state of war, always raiding one another for resources unique to each planet. However, when an alien named Tekla comes from another solar system, she brings a warning: the Beast Planet is coming. Now Graveheart, a humble miner of Planet Rock, must convince the leaders of Fire, Rock, Bone, and Ice to put aside their differences and stand together against the Beast, their new common enemy.

The story begins as Tekla's homeworld of Planet Tek is consumed by the Beast Planet. She and her robotic companion, Voxx, escape to the Cluster through a Beast jump portal to warn them of the impending danger. Tekla is pursued by Beast drones and crash-lands on Planet Ice, where she is rescued by Graveheart. The drones subsequently attack and slaughter the combined forces of Rock and Ice in the area, leaving only Tekla, Graveheart, and Ice King Cryos. The threat convinces Cryos and Graveheart to form an alliance of the Cluster worlds against the Beast Planet.

The first season revolves around the efforts of Graveheart, who has become the de facto leader of the Alliance, to convince the leaders of the other Cluster worlds to join the Alliance. The first planet they visit is his home planet, Planet Rock, but Lord Mantel stubbornly refuses to ally himself with the other worlds after Rock's Battle Moons repel a Beast attack. Graveheart's friend and captain of the Royal Guard, Jade, joins him to help rally planets Fire and Bone to his cause. Fire and Bone join the Alliance.

The Beast forces are tracked to the dead world of Remora, converted into a fortress by the Beast drones. An attack by the combined forces of Ice, Fire, and Bone, with some timely intervention by Rock's Battle Moons, sees the destruction of Remora. However, this only serves to anger the Beast Planet, which emerges from within the Cluster's star and proves its superiority by destroying one of the Battle Moons with a single blast from halfway across the system. It then unleashes its wrath upon the nearest planet; Fire.

The second season focuses on the Alliance's efforts to avoid the unstoppable Beast Planet. Each world in the Cluster is discovered to be equipped with "World Engines", massive drive systems which can propel the planets through space. Using these, the worlds of the Cluster flee the Beast; Fire's engine is damaged and the planet is thus sacrificed in a futile attempt to stop the Beast. Fire's population is moved to the remaining Battle Moons, now down to three following the battle to save Fire. On their journey, they discover Planet Sand, which joins the Alliance, and Planet Jungle, which the Alliance blows up when the Beast tries to consume it; this, too, proves useless. The plants of Jungle live on as a single cutting which is given to Emperor Femur of Bone.

The finale introduces the Prison Planet, a teleport world used as a penal colony. Graveheart and Cryos are captured by a faction of convicts led by Jewelia, a devious woman who takes a liking to Graveheart. Femur and Jade are taken by a second faction commanded by Sternum, Femur's nobler brother, from whom Femur stole the throne of Planet Bone. Convinced that their friends have been slain by the other faction, the two pairs join the fight on the side of their respective faction until the truth is revealed. Meanwhile, Lord Mantel takes control of the Alliance by force, convinced that his forces are superior to the Beast. His arrogance nearly dooms the Alliance and costs Mantel his life when Blokk invades Rock and kills him in single combat. As the Beast Planet is about to consume Planet Rock, the Prison Planet teleports into its path. Graveheart and his group use Sternum's Telepod to travel to Rock. Sternum then teleports the Prison Planet out of the system, taking the Beast Planet with it. Alliance members mistakenly think that Beast Planet would have been destroyed during the teleportation. A final battle between Graveheart and Blokk results in Blokk's demise, Jade's rise to ruler of Planet Rock, and the Alliance's new era of peace. However, the story ends with a scene in a distant part of the galaxy, moments before the destruction of Planet Reptizar at the hands of the Beast Planet.

Although the show ended after its second season, a proposed third would have answered major questions, like the origin of the Beast Planet.

Setting
The main setting of Shadow Raiders is the Cluster, a series of four interdependent worlds. The four main planets – Fire, Rock, Bone, and Ice – have warred for as long as any of them can remember over their natural resources: Fire produces energy, Rock produces metals and minerals, Bone produces food, and Ice produces water, and all four worlds depend on each other to survive.

A large part of the series mythology in the second season is the World Engines, a propulsion system built into the planets of the Cluster (and presumably many other worlds, since two different planets in different solar systems have them) by an ancient alien race. Using five mountain-sized energy thrusters which emerge from the planet's surface, the World Engines can propel a planet through space at great speeds. A combination of an atmospheric shield and artificial gravity generators keep the sudden shift in orbit and lack of a star from killing everyone on the surface. The Prison Planet has a variation known as Teleport Engines, which teleport the world to different locations in space instantly. The same artificial gravity and atmospheric shielding technology is used to protect the inhabitants. Each set of engines is located at the core of its world and can be reached using Telepods, small platforms on the surface of each world. The Telepods send the user to the core of the planet where they can use the computer to move the planet. The Telepods can also be used to move people from one planet to another.

The World Engines are equipped with sensors capable of detecting – but not acting upon – threats to the planet. The AI is able to recommend a course of action, and does not appear to require clearance of any sort, responding to any voice commands given. The Telepod technology was reverse-engineered by Tekla to create a force field generator so anyone can physically fight a Null Matter being without disintegrating on contact.

Main characters

Cast
 Donna Yamamoto as Tekla
 Paul Dobson as Graveheart
 Mark Oliver as King Cryos
 Enuka Okuma as Jade
 Matt Hill as Prince Pyrus
 Scott McNeil as Pelvus and Blokk
 Jim Byrnes as Grand Vizier
 Garry Chalk as Emperor Femur
 Tasha Simms as Lamprey
 Blu Mankuma as Lord Mantle
 Tegan Moss as Lady Zera
 Janyse Jaud as Jewelia
 Ellen Kennedy as Zuma
 John Payne as Sternum

War Planets toy line
The Shadow Raiders series was based on the War Planets toys from Trendmasters. Toys of Planets Ice, Fire, Bone, Rock, Sand, Tek, Water, Reptizar, Remora, the Beast Planet, several Battle Moons and Beast, Bone and Ice Tanks were created. The series is not strictly set around the toys since more worlds than just Rock have Battle Moons. Several toys were brought out that were based on the Shadow Raiders series but they were either figures of the main characters or ships.

Episodes

Series overview

Season 1 (1998)

Season 2 (1999)

Cancellation
The series had originally been planned to have three seasons and 40 episodes in total. But during the exhibition of season two, the toy line had very low sales in Canada. Because of this, despite the series receiving good ratings, the producers decided to cancel it because the series was made to promote the toy line. Due to the cancellation, the third season was not made.

Home releases
The entire series was released on DVD by ADV Films in the year 2000. The series was spread over six volumes. Bonus features on the DVDs included data files on the characters, animation turnarounds, and a series trailer, featuring original animation not seen in the series. Much like fellow Mainframe Entertainment series ReBoot, the North American DVDs are long out of print and rare, though tend to fetch substantially less than other Mainframe DVDs.

Both complete seasons are available in two sets in the United Kingdom. Eight volumes were released in Germany (English + German audio) and six volumes were released in Russia, both also containing all 26 episodes.

See also
 Trendmasters makers of War Planets
 Mainframe Entertainment producers of Shadow Raiders
 List of Shadow Raiders characters

References

External links
 
 War Planets toy line

1998 Canadian television series debuts
1999 Canadian television series endings
1990s Canadian animated television series
1990s Canadian science fiction television series
Animated television series about extraterrestrial life
YTV (Canadian TV channel) original programming
Canadian computer-animated television series
Works by Len Wein
Television series by Corus Entertainment
Television series by Rainmaker Studios
Canadian children's animated action television series
Canadian children's animated space adventure television series
Canadian children's animated science fantasy television series
English-language television shows
Television shows filmed in Vancouver
Television series set on fictional planets